April 1 - Eastern Orthodox liturgical calendar - April 3

All fixed commemorations below are observed on April 15 by Orthodox Churches on the Old Calendar.

For April 2nd, Orthodox Churches on the Old Calendar commemorate the Saints listed on March 20.

Saints

 Martyrs Amphianus (Apphianus) and his brother Aedesius, of Patara, Lycia (306)
 Virgin-martyr Theodora of Palestine (Theodosia of Tyre) (308)  (see also: April 3)
 Martyr Polycarp of Alexandria (4th century)
 Venerable Stephen the Wonderworker, in Ascalon, Palestine (778)
 Venerable Titus the Wonderworker (9th century)
 Saint George of Atsquri, Georgia (9th-10th centuries)

Pre-Schism Western saints

 Saint Urban of Langres, sixth Bishop of Langres in France, patron-saint of vine dressers (ca. 390)
 Saint Abundius, of Greek origin, he became Bishop of Como in the north of Italy (469)
 Saint Victor of Capua, Bishop of Capua in the south of Italy and a Church writer (554)
 Saint Nicetius of Lyon (Nizier), in Gaul (573)
 Saint Brónach (Bromana), called the Virgin of Glen-Seichis, now Kilbronach in Ireland.
 Saint Musa, a child in Rome who was granted visions, mentioned by her contemporary by St Gregory the Great (6th century)
 Saints Lonochilus (Longis, Lenogisil), priest who founded a monastery in Maine in France (653), and Agnofleda, a holy virgin (638)
 Venerable Virgin-martyr Æbbe the Younger of Coldingham, Abbess of Coldingham Priory in south-east Scotland (870)  (see also: June 22)
 Saint Constantín mac Cináeda (Constantine I), King of Scotland, slain in a battle against heathen invaders of his country and honoured as a martyr, buried at Iona (877)
 Saint Rufus, a hermit at Glendalough in Ireland.
 Saint Drogo, a monk at Fleury-sur-Loire in France and afterwards at Baume-les-Messieurs (10th century)

Post-Schism Orthodox saints

 Saint Sabbas, Archbishop of Sourozh, Crimea (11th century)
 Venerable Gregory, ascetic of Nicomedia (1240)

Icon gallery

Notes

References

Sources
 April 2 / April 15. Orthodox Calendar (PRAVOSLAVIE.RU).
 April 15 / April 2. Holy Trinity Russian Orthodox Church (A parish of the Patriarchate of Moscow).
 April 2. OCA - The Lives of the Saints.
 The Autonomous Orthodox Metropolia of Western Europe and the Americas (ROCOR). St. Hilarion Calendar of Saints for the year of our Lord 2004. St. Hilarion Press (Austin, TX). p. 26.
 April 2. Latin Saints of the Orthodox Patriarchate of Rome.
 The Roman Martyrology. Transl. by the Archbishop of Baltimore. Last Edition, According to the Copy Printed at Rome in 1914. Revised Edition, with the Imprimatur of His Eminence Cardinal Gibbons. Baltimore: John Murphy Company, 1916. p. 94.
 Rev. Richard Stanton. A Menology of England and Wales, or, Brief Memorials of the Ancient British and English Saints Arranged According to the Calendar, Together with the Martyrs of the 16th and 17th Centuries. London: Burns & Oates, 1892. pp. 140–141.
Greek Sources
 Great Synaxaristes:  2 Απριλιου. Μεγασ ΣυναΞαριστησ.
  Συναξαριστής. 2 Απριλίου. Ecclesia.gr. (H Εκκλησια Τησ Ελλαδοσ). 
Russian Sources
  15 апреля (2 апреля). Православная Энциклопедия под редакцией Патриарха Московского и всея Руси Кирилла (электронная версия). (Orthodox Encyclopedia - Pravenc.ru).
  2 апреля (ст.ст.) 15 апреля 2013 (нов. ст.) . Русская Православная Церковь Отдел внешних церковных связей. (DECR).

April in the Eastern Orthodox calendar